Karl-Erik Lilja (born April 24, 1957) is a retired Swedish ice hockey player. Lilja began playing hockey in Hammarby IF's youth organisation but moved to Södertälje SK in 1976 to play in the Swedish Elitserien. After two seasons in Södertälje, he returned to his first club for one season. The team reached the playoff to Elitserien, but lost in the first round against Timrå IK. The following season, Lilja moved to Djurgårdens IF where he would spend the rest of his playing career. In 1983 he won the Swedish championship with Djurgården, and became team captain in 1986. He kept the title until 1988. During his two last seasons in Djurgården, he won two Swedish championships.

Career statistics

References

External links

1957 births
Djurgårdens IF Hockey players
Södertälje SK players
Living people
Swedish ice hockey defencemen